Laurent Mohellebi (born 5 January 1984) is a French footballer. He played for Atlético Baleares.

Career
Born  in Marseille, Mohellebi has played for Paris Saint-Germain F.C., AS Monaco FC, FC Istres and the Albanian champions SK Tirana in the Albanian Superliga.

International career
He was part of the France national U-17 team that won the FIFA U-17 World Cup in 2001.

Notes

1984 births
Living people
French footballers
French sportspeople of Algerian descent
Footballers from Marseille
FC Istres players
Ligue 1 players
Ligue 2 players
Association football midfielders
KF Tirana players
Expatriate footballers in Albania
ASA Issy players
CD Atlético Baleares footballers
France youth international footballers